The 2015 All-Ireland Senior Football Championship was the 128th edition of the GAA's premier inter-county Gaelic football since its establishment in 1887. 33 teams took part − 31 counties of Ireland (excluding Kilkenny), London and New York.

Dublin dethroned defending champions Kerry in the final, winning by 0–12 to 0–9.

Teams
A total of 33 teams contested the championship – 31 teams from Ireland plus London and New York. As in previous years, Kilkenny footballers did not field a team. New York does not participate in the qualifiers.

Format
Connacht, Leinster, Munster and Ulster organise four provincial championships on a knock-out basis. All the teams beaten in the provincial matches (except New York) enter the All-Ireland Qualifiers in rounds 1, 2 and 4. The qualifier matches are knock-out and eventually result in four teams who play in the All-Ireland Quarter-Finals against the four provincial winners. From the quarter-finals onwards the competition is entirely knock-out.

Broadcasting
RTÉ, the national broadcaster in Ireland provided live television coverage of the championship. In the second year of a deal running from 2014 until 2016, a number of matches were also broadcast by Sky Sports, with Sky having exclusive rights to some games.

Australia's terrestrial Seven Network announced it would not broadcast Gaelic games following its coverage of the 2014 Championship.

As in the 2014 season, the GAA and RTÉ provided a streaming service called GAAGO intended to stream championship games worldwide. The subscription-based service was available to fans everywhere in the world outside of the island of Ireland, including all the games broadcast in Ireland exclusively by Sky Sports.
All televised games from the football and hurling championships, as broadcast by both RTÉ and Sky were be available to watch on GAAGO.

Stadia and locations

Fixtures and results

Connacht Senior Football Championship

Leinster Senior Football Championship

Munster Senior Football Championship

Ulster Senior Football Championship

All-Ireland Series

Qualifiers

A and B teams
An A and B system for the qualifying draws was introduced in 2014 and continued in 2015. The teams were designated as A or B depending on which half of their provincial championships they were initially drawn to play in. Typically the provincial draws were not seeded, resulting in random A and B team designations.

In all qualifier rounds A teams played A teams and B teams played B teams. Usually the A teams completed their provincial games before the B teams, which allowed the A qualifier games to be scheduled a week before the B qualifier games.

Round 1
The first round consisted of all teams that failed to reach their provincial semi-finals, with the exception of New York. 16 teams in total took part.

In round 1 four A teams played four A teams and four B teams played four B teams. The eight round 1 winners played the eight beaten provincial semi-finalists in round 2 of the qualifiers.

The following teams took part in this round:

 

 London 

 Leitrim 

 

 Carlow  

 Offaly  

 Laois 

 Longford  

 Louth  

 Wexford 

 Wicklow  

 

 Waterford 

 Limerick 

 

 Antrim 

 Cavan 

 Armagh 

 Down 

 Tyrone

Round 2
In the second round of the qualifiers the eight winning teams from Round 1A and Round 1B played the eight beaten provincial semi-finalists. The round 2 draw was unrestricted − if two teams had played each other in a provincial match they could be drawn to meet again. The eight winners of these matches played each other in Round 3.

 Antrim

 Cavan

 Longford

 Offaly

 Clare

 Kildare

 Fermanagh

 Roscommon

 Armagh

 Louth

 Wexford

 Tyrone

 Derry

 Galway

 Tipperary

 Meath

Round 3
In the third round of the qualifiers winning teams from round 2A played against winning teams from round 2A and winning teams from round 2B played against winning teams from round 2B. Round 3 rules did not allow two teams that had played each other in a provincial match to meet again. The four winners of these matches played the four beaten provincial finalists in Round 4.

 Kildare

 Longford

 Roscommon

 Fermanagh

 Derry

 Tipperary

 Tyrone

 Galway

Round 4
In the fourth round of the qualifiers, the four winning teams of Round 3A and Round 3B played the four provincial beaten finalists. Round 4 rules did not allow two teams that had played each other in a provincial match to meet again if such a pairing could be avoided. The four winners of these matches played the provincial winners in the All-Ireland Quarter-Finals.

 Kildare

 Fermanagh

 Westmeath

 Cork

 Tyrone

 Galway

 Sligo

 Donegal

All-Ireland knockout
(D) = Draw (R) = Replay

Quarter-finals
The four provincial champions played the winners from Round 4 of the qualifiers. If one of the provincial champions had already met one of the qualifiers in an earlier match then those two teams could not be drawn together.

Semi-finals
There was no draw for the semi-finals as the fixtures were pre-determined on a three yearly rotation. This rotation ensured that a province's champions played the champions of all the other provinces once every three years in the semi-finals if they each won their quarter-finals. If a qualifier team defeated a provincial winner in a quarter-final, the qualifier team took that provincial winner's place in the semi-final.

Final

Championship statistics
All scores correct as of September 20, 2015

Scoring
First goal of the championship:
Shane Walsh for Galway against New York (3 May 2015)
Widest winning margin: 27 points
Dublin 4-25 – 0-10 Longford (Leinster quarter-final)
Kerry 7-16 – 0-10 Kildare (All-Ireland quarter-final)
Most goals in a match:  8
Mayo 6-25 – 2-11 Sligo (Connacht final)
Most points in a match: 38
Dublin 2-23 – 2-15 Fermanagh (All-Ireland quarter-final)
Most goals by one team in a match: 7
Kerry 7-16 – 0-10 Kildare (All-Ireland quarter-final)
 Highest aggregate score: 60
Mayo 6-25 – 2-11 Sligo (Connacht final)
Lowest aggregate score: 21
Monaghan 0-11 – 0-10 Donegal (Ulster final)
Dublin 0-12 – 0-9 Kerry (All-Ireland final)
Most goals scored by a losing team: 3
Meath 2-19 – 3-12 Wicklow (Leinster quarter-final)

Top scorers
Overall

Single game

Discipline
 First red card of the championship: Neil Gallagher for Donegal against Tyrone (17 May 2015)

Miscellaneous
 Westmeath recorded their first ever championship win over Meath in the Leinster semi-final.
 Tyrone met Limerick and Tipperary for the first time in championship history, with Tyrone coming out on top of both games.
 In the old system we would have seen a Kerry vs Monaghan All Ireland semi-final.

Referees' Panel 2015

Live broadcast matches
The following matches were broadcast live on television in Ireland.

Awards
The Sunday Game Team of the Year
The Sunday Game team of the year was picked on 20 September, the night of the final. Dublin's Jack McCaffrey was named as The Sunday Game player of the year.

1. Brendan Kealy (Kerry)
2. Shane Enright (Kerry)
3. Rory O'Carroll (Dublin)
4. Philly McMahon (Dublin)
5. Lee Keegan (Mayo)
6. Cian O’Sullivan (Dublin)
7. Jack McCaffrey (Dublin)
8. Anthony Maher (Kerry)
9. Brian Fenton (Dublin)
10. Mattie Donnelly (Tyrone)
11. Ciarán Kilkenny (Dublin)
12. Donnchadh Walsh (Kerry)
13. Conor McManus (Monaghan)
14. Aidan O'Shea (Mayo)
15. Bernard Brogan (Dublin)

All Star Team of the Year
The All Star football team was announced on 6 November. Dublin's Jack McCaffrey was named as the All Stars Footballer of the Year with Diarmuid O'Connor of Mayo being named as the All Stars Young Footballer of the Year.

1. Brendan Kealy (Kerry)
2. Shane Enright (Kerry)
3. Rory O'Carroll (Dublin)
4. Philly McMahon (Dublin)
5. Lee Keegan (Mayo)
6. Cian O'Sullivan (Dublin)
7. Jack McCaffrey (Dublin)
8. Brian Fenton (Dublin)
9. Anthony Maher (Kerry)
10. Mattie Donnelly (Tyrone)
11. Ciarán Kilkenny (Dublin)
12. Donnchadh Walsh (Kerry)
13. Conor McManus (Monaghan)
14. Aidan O'Shea (Mayo)
15. Bernard Brogan (Dublin)

See also
 2016 All-Ireland Minor Football Championship
 2016 All-Ireland Under-21 Football Championship

References